Belgium participated in the Eurovision Song Contest 2008 with the song "O Julissi" written by Michel Vangheluwe. The song was performed by the band Ishtar. The Belgian entry for the 2008 contest in Belgrade, Serbia was selected through the national final Eurosong '08, organised by the Flemish broadcaster Vlaamse Radio- en Televisieomroeporganisatie (VRT). The competition featured twenty competing entries and consisted of seven shows. In the final on 9 March 2008, "O Julissi Na Jalini" performed by Ishtar was selected as the winner via a public televote. The song was later retitled as "O Julissi".

Belgium was drawn to compete in the first semi-final of the Eurovision Song Contest which took place on 20 May 2008. Performing during the show in position 6, "O Julissi" was not announced among the 10 qualifying entries of the first semi-final and therefore did not qualify to compete in the final. It was later revealed that Belgium placed seventeenth out of the 19 participating countries in the semi-final with 16 points.

Background

In 2007, The KMG's represented the country with the song "Love Power", placing twenty-sixth in the semi-final and failing to advance to the final.

The Belgian broadcaster for the 2008 contest, who broadcasts the event in Belgium and organises the selection process for its entry, was Vlaamse Radio- en Televisieomroeporganisatie (VRT). The Belgian participation in the contest alternates between two broadcasters: the Flemish VRT and the Walloon Radio Télévision Belge de la Communauté Française (RTBF). Both broadcasters have selected the Belgian entry using national finals and internal selections in the past. In 2006, VRT organised the national final Eurosong in order to select the Belgian entry, while in 2007, RTBF internally selected both the artist and song that would represent the nation. On 24 April 2007, VRT confirmed Belgium's participation in the 2008 Eurovision Song Contest and announced that the Eurosong national final would be held to select their entry.

Before Eurovision

Eurosong '08 
Eurosong '08 was the national final that selected Belgium's entry in the Eurovision Song Contest 2008. The competition consisted of seven shows that commenced on 27 January 2008 and concluded with a final on 9 March 2008 where the winning song and artist were selected. All shows took place at the VRT studios in Brussels, hosted by Bart Peeters and were broadcast on Eén. The final was also broadcast online at the official Eurovision Song Contest website eurovision.tv.

Format 
Twenty entries were selected to compete in Eurosong. Four heats took place on 27 January 2008, 3 February 2008, 10 February 2008 and 17 February 2008 with each show featuring five entries. The top two as determined by public televoting qualified to the semi-finals, while a panel of experts also selected two wildcards out of the third and fourth placed acts in the heats to advance. Two semi-finals took place on 24 February and 2 March 2008 with each show featuring five entries. The top two as determined by public televoting qualified to the final, while the expert panel also selected a wildcard out of the third and fourth placed acts in the semi-finals to advance. The final took place on 9 March 2008 where the winner was chosen by public televoting.

During each of the seven shows, the expert panel provided commentary and feedback to the artists as well as selected entries to advance in the competition. The experts were:

 Katrina Leskanich – American singer, winner of the Eurovision Song Contest 1997 as part of Katrina and the Waves
 Kris Wauters – musician, represented Belgium in the Eurovision Song Contest 1991 as part of Clouseau
 Marcel Vanthilt – singer and television presenter

Competing entries 
A submission period was opened on 24 April 2007 for artists and songwriters to submit their entries until 23 November 2007. The twenty acts selected by VRT for the competition from 450 entries received during the submission period were announced on 17 December 2007.

Shows

Heats 
The four heats took place on 27 January, 3 February, 10 February and 17 February 2008. In each show five entries competed and public televoting solely determined the top two that qualified to the semi-finals. An additional two entries were awarded wildcards by the expert panel from the third and fourth placed acts in the heats to proceed to the semi-finals.

Semi-finals 
The two semi-finals took place on 24 February and 2 March 2008. In each show five entries competed and public televoting solely determined the top two that qualified to the final. An additional entry was awarded a wildcard by the expert panel from the third and fourth placed acts in the semi-finals to proceed to the final.

Final 
The final took place on 7 March 2008 where the five entries that qualified from the preceding two semi-finals competed. The winner, "O Julissi Na Jalini" performed by Ishtar, was selected solely by public televoting.

Ratings

Promotion 
Ishtar specifically promoted "O Julissi" as the Belgian Eurovision entry by appearing in the Netherlands during the RTL 4 programme Life and Cooking on 4 May 2008. The promotional activity was financially supported by Flemish Minister of Culture Bert Anciaux who conferred a state support of €25,000 to the band.

At Eurovision
It was announced in September 2007 that the competition's format would be expanded to two semi-finals in 2008. According to the rules, all nations with the exceptions of the host country and the "Big Four" (France, Germany, Spain and the United Kingdom) are required to qualify from one of two semi-finals in order to compete for the final; the top nine songs from each semi-final as determined by televoting progress to the final, and a tenth was determined by back-up juries. The European Broadcasting Union (EBU) split up the competing countries into six different pots based on voting patterns from previous contests, with countries with favourable voting histories put into the same pot. On 28 January 2008, a special allocation draw was held which placed each country into one of the two semi-finals. Belgium was placed into the first semi-final, to be held on 20 May 2008. The running order for the semi-finals was decided through another draw on 17 March 2008 and Belgium was set to perform in position 6, following the entry from San Marino and before the entry from Azerbaijan.

The two semi-finals and the final was broadcast in Belgium by both the Flemish and Walloon broadcasters. VRT broadcast the shows on één with commentary in Dutch by Bart Peeters and André Vermeulen. RTBF televised the shows on La Une with commentary in French by Jean-Pierre Hautier and Jean-Louis Lahaye. All shows were also broadcast by VRT on Radio 2 with commentary in Dutch by Michel Follet and Sven Pichal, and by RTBF on La Première with commentary in French by Patrick Duhamel and Corinne Boulangier. The Belgian spokesperson, who announced the Belgian votes during the final, was Sandrine Van Handenhoven.

Semi-final 

Ishtar took part in technical rehearsals on 11 and 15 May, followed by dress rehearsals on 19 and 20 May. The Belgian performance featured the members of Ishtar performing on stage with lead singer Soetkin Baptist in a red and white dress and walking intermittently between the other members throughout the song. Due to the band originally consisting of ten members, four of them were not featured during the performance. The stage setting was dark and the LED screens displayed graphics resembling musical notes. The Belgian performance was choreographed by Ricardo Overman.

At the end of the show, Belgium was not announced among the top 10 entries in the first semi-final and therefore failed to qualify to compete in the final. It was later revealed that Belgium placed seventeenth in the semi-final, receiving a total of 16 points.

Voting 
Below is a breakdown of points awarded to Belgium and awarded by Belgium in the first semi-final and grand final of the contest. The nation awarded its 12 points to Armenia in the semi-final and the final of the contest.

Points awarded to Belgium

Points awarded by Belgium

References

External links 
 Eurosong Official Website

2008
Countries in the Eurovision Song Contest 2008
Eurovision